The 2005 RCA Championships was a tennis tournament played on outdoor hard courts. It was the 18th edition of the event known that year as the RCA Championships, and was part of the International Series of the 2005 ATP Tour. It took place at the Indianapolis Tennis Center in Indianapolis, Indiana, United States, from July 18 through July 25, 2005. It was the first event of the 2005 US Open series. Robby Ginepri won the singles title.

Finals

Singles

 Robby Ginepri defeated  Taylor Dent, 4–6, 6–3, 3–0 (retired)
It was Robby Ginepri's 1st title of the year, and his 2nd overall.

Doubles

 Paul Hanley /  Graydon Oliver defeated  Simon Aspelin /  Todd Perry, 6–2, 3–1 (retired)

External links
 Official website
 Singles draw
 Doubles draw